WWW is an Austrian children's television series.

See also
List of Austrian television series

Austrian television series
ORF (broadcaster)
Austrian children's television series
2008 Austrian television series debuts
2000s Austrian television series
2010s Austrian television series
German-language television shows